Duchess Sophie of Prussia (c. 31 March 1582 – c. 24 November 1610) was a German princess of the Duchy of Prussia, a fief of Kingdom of Poland and a member of the House of Hohenzollern.

Sophie was the daughter of Albert Frederick, Duke of Prussia, and Marie Eleonore of Cleves. She was courted by Wilhelm Kettler, son of Gotthard Kettler of Courland and Anna of Mecklenburg-Schwerin. Their marriage contract was signed in Königsberg on 5 January 1609. Sophie died on 24 November 1610, four weeks after the birth of her only son, Jacob, who later succeeded his paternal uncle Friedrich Kettler as Duke of Courland.

References

1582 births
1610 deaths
17th-century Latvian people
People from the Duchy of Prussia
House of Hohenzollern
Prussian princesses
Duchesses of Courland
Burials in the Ducal Crypt of the Jelgava Palace
Deaths in childbirth
Daughters of monarchs